Vulićević is a surname. Notable people with the surname include:

Đuša Vulićević (1771–1805), Serbian noble and revolutionary
Miroslav Vulićević (born 1985), Serbian footballer
Vujica Vulićević (1773–1828), Serbian noble and revolutionary

Serbian surnames